Hoover-Timme House is a historic home located at Long Beach, LaPorte County, Indiana.  It was designed by architect John Lloyd Wright and built in 1929.  It is a three level house carved into a sand dune on the shore of Lake Michigan.  The house is in a rambling Prairie School style with hipped and mansard roof forms. The house is sheathed in ashlar sandstone and stucco. Also contributing is the house site.

It was listed on the National Register of Historic Places in 2013.

References

Houses on the National Register of Historic Places in Indiana
Prairie School architecture in Indiana
Houses completed in 1929
Houses in LaPorte County, Indiana
National Register of Historic Places in LaPorte County, Indiana